Fred Stenson may refer to:

 Fred Stenson (politician), former Canadian MP for Peterborough
 Fred Stenson (writer), writer of historical fiction from Alberta

See also
 Fred Stinson, a puppeteer; see Cult of Chucky
 Fred C. Stinson (1922–2007), Canadian politician